This is a list of flag bearers who have represented Hungary at the Olympics.

Flag bearers carry the national flag of their country at the opening ceremony of the Olympic Games.

See also
Hungary at the Olympics

References

Hungary at the Olympics
Olympics
Hungary